The North Eastern Railway (NER) 1001 Class  was a class of long-boiler 0-6-0 steam locomotive designed by William Bouch.

Technical data

History
The "long boiler" design dated back to a Stephenson design of 1842. At that time there was a controversy about keeping the centre of gravity low.  Another point of view was espoused by John Gray who set out to improve efficiency and increase the pressure in shorter boilers using single drivers instead of coupled wheels. His ideas led to the design of the highly successful Jenny Lind locomotive.

The long boiler design with coupled wheels continued for slower heavier work. A total of 192 NER 1001 class locomotives were built from 1852 by a number of private manufacturers, as well as the NER's own works at Darlington and Shildon.

The small size of the firebox would seem remarkable in later years, but the engines were ideal where trains might spend long periods standing, waiting for a path, or when shunting. A minimum amount of fuel would have delivered sufficient heat to the large boiler to start heavy loads.

The last ten NER 1001s were delivered in 1875. Many were rebuilt in the following twenty five years. The last was withdrawn in 1923.  

Accidents and incidents
On 5 November 1900, locomotive No. 1245 was hauling a freight train when it ran away and was derailed by trap points at Lingdale Junction, Yorkshire.
On 8 August 1909, a locomotive of the class was hauling a freight train which was derailed at Hartley, Cumberland due to heat buckled track.

References

External links
The Bouch NER '1001' Class 0-6-0 Locomotives
The Great Western Archive

1001
0-6-0 locomotives
Railway locomotives introduced in 1852
Freight locomotives